Robert Manson (born 11 October 1989) is a New Zealand rower.

Manson was born in 1989. He is from a family of rowers, with his father Greg the singles lightweight national champion in 1985, and his brother Karl also competing internationally.

He won a bronze medal at the 2015 World Rowing Championships. At the 2017 New Zealand rowing nationals at Lake Ruataniwha, he partnered with Chris Harris in the men's double sculls and they became national champions. Manson also became single sculls national champion, aided by the absence of both Mahé Drysdale and Hamish Bond.

In 2014, Manson came out as gay being one of the first out LGBT persons in rowing from New Zealand.

In 2017, Manson won the men's single sculls at the World Rowing Cup II in Poznań, Poland, setting a new world best time of 6:30.74, beating Mahé Drysdale's record by 3 seconds. As of August 2022 that time still stood as the world's best.

On 20 October 2020, Manson announced his retirement from rowing.

References

Living people
1989 births
New Zealand male rowers
Olympic rowers of New Zealand
Rowers at the 2012 Summer Olympics
World Rowing Championships medalists for New Zealand
Rowers at the 2016 Summer Olympics
New Zealand LGBT sportspeople
Gay sportsmen
Queer men
LGBT rowers